Otter Dock was a branch of the Grand Junction Canal (renamed Grand Union Canal from 1929) in Yiewsley, Middlesex. 

In March 1818, permission was obtained from the Grand Junction Canal Company by a Mr John Mills for a dock to be built to service Yiewsley's brickmaking industry. Otter Dock would be the longest of nine arms and docks that served Yiewsley's industries. With the inclusion of the arms within Otter dock, its total length was 1845 yards (1.05 miles /1.68 km). 

Through the rest of the nineteenth century brick-earth was moulded and fired in clamp kilns within Yiewsley's brick-fields with the finished bricks being transported via the Otter Dock and the Grand Junction Canal Paddington Arm to the South Wharf in the Paddington Basin and also to wharves situated along the Regent's Canal and to other locations along the canal and the River Thames. The bricks were then used in the construction of 19th-century London.
 

By the beginning of the 20th century, the brick-fields and the later gravel pits which the Otter Dock served had been worked out. By November 1906 a cofferdam had been placed at its entrance from the Grand Junction Canal mainline. Filling in Otter Dock north of Horton Road began in 1909 and was completed in 1911. On 17 November 1910 work began on planting 70 chestnut and beech trees along the filled-in canal between Colham Road (known as Wharf or Dock Road until May 1904.) and Ernest Road in the southern section of the former Arm. The roads were renamed Colham Avenue in 1938. The wide boulevard of Poplar Avenue was part of the northern section of the Arm.

South of Horton road Otter Dock remained through much of the 20th Century and was used in the 1930s as a boat repair facility. A water pumping station of the Rickmansworth & Uxbridge Valley Water Works Co was constructed adjacent to the truncated arm. The dock was also used by the Johnson's wax company and by timber merchant James Davies Ltd.

In the late twentieth century the arm was filled in and today the site of the dock and pumping station is the location of the Knowles Close housing estate.

References

Canals in London
Transport in the London Borough of Hillingdon
London docks